The Maungakiekie-Tāmaki Local Board is one of the 21 local boards of the Auckland Council. It is the only local board overseen by the council's Maungakiekie-Tāmaki Ward councillor (some wards administer more than one local board).

The Maungakiekie-Tāmaki board, named after Maungakiekie / One Tree Hill and the Tamaki River estuary in the board area, covers the suburbs of Glen Innes, Mount Wellington, Onehunga, Oranga, Panmure, Penrose, Point England, Royal Oak, Southdown, Sylvia Park, Tamaki, Te Papapa, Wai o Taiki Bay, and Westfield. 

The board is governed by seven board members elected from two subdivisions: three from the Maungakiekie subdivision (board area west of the Southern Motorway, excluding Westfield), and four from the Tāmaki subdivision (Westfield and board area east of the Southern Motorway). The first board members were elected with the nationwide local elections on Saturday 9 October 2010.

Demographics

2019–2022 term
The current board members, elected at the 2019 local body elections, are:

2016–2019 term
The board members, elected at the 2016 local body elections or in a subsequent by-election, were:

n1 This member was elected in a May 2018 by-election triggered when member Josephine Bartley was elected as a ward councillor.

Election results

2016 election results

Maungakiekie subdivision

Tāmaki subdivision

2013 election results

Maungakiekie subdivision

Tāmaki subdivision

2010 election results

Maungakiekie subdivision

Tāmaki subdivision

List of board chairs

References

Local boards of the Auckland Region